Epinotia tenebrica is a species of moth of the family Tortricidae. It is found in Morona-Santiago Province, Ecuador.

The wingspan is about 24 mm. The forewings are pale ochreous cream sprinkled and suffused with brownish except for the dorsal area, where the costal strigulae (fine streaks) are cream interrupted with brown. The hindwings are whitish grey up to the middle, mixed with pale brownish in the remaining area. The strigulation is brownish.

Etymology
The species name refers to colouration of the forewings and is derived from Latin tenebricus (meaning darkened).

References

Moths described in 2006
Eucosmini